Ivan Lendl was the defending champion.

Lendl successfully defended his title, defeating Kevin Curren 7–6, 6–2 in the final.

Seeds

Draw

Finals

Top half

Section 1

Section 2

Section 3

Section 4

External links
 Main draw

1988 Grand Prix (tennis)